Latehar railway station is a small railway station in Latehar district, Jharkhand. Its code is LTHR. It serves Latehar city. The station consists of two platforms. The platforms are not well sheltered. It lacks many facilities including water and sanitation.

In June 2015, the Palamu Express was derailed near Latehar by a Maoist explosive attack. There were no casualties.

Major trains 

 Garib Nawaz Express
 Santragachi–Ajmer Weekly Express
 Barkakana–Varanasi Passenger 
 Barkakana–Dehri-on-Sone Passenger 
 Barwadih–Netaji Subhas Chandra Bose Gomoh Passenger 
 Howrah–Bhopal Weekly Express
 Ranchi–Chopan Express (unreserved)
 Chopan–Netaji Subhas Chandra Bose Gomoh Passenger 
 Sambalpur–Jammu Tawi Express
 Muri Express
 Jharkhand Swarna Jayanti Express (via Barkakana)
 Ranchi–New Delhi Garib Rath Express
 Palamau Express
 Ranchi–Varanasi Express
 Sambalpur–Varanasi Express
 Shaktipunj Express

References

Railway stations in Latehar district
Dhanbad railway division